Joachim von Siegroth (25 December 1896 – 2 May 1945) was a general in the Wehrmacht of Nazi Germany during World War II. He was a recipient of the Knight's Cross of the Iron Cross.  Siegroth was listed as missing in action during the Battle of Halbe in May 1945.

Awards and decorations
 Iron Cross (1914) 2nd Class (9 October 1914)

 Clasp to the Iron Cross (1939) 2nd Class (12 June 1940) & 1st Class (22 June 1940)
 Honour Roll Clasp of the Army (19 December 1941)
 German Cross in Gold on 19 December 1941 as Oberstleutnant in Infanterie-Regiment 255
 Knight's Cross of the Iron Cross with Oak Leaves
 Knight's Cross on 18 October 1944 as Oberst and commander of a Kampfgruppe of the Fahnenjunker-Schule VI of the infantry Metz

Towards the end of the war, Siegroth was nominated for the Oak Leaves. The Heerespersonalamt (HPA—Army Staff Office) received the nomination for the Oak Leaves from the commander-in-chief of the 9. Armee Theodor Busse via teleprinter message on 21 April 1945 announcing that a detailed statement with explanations will follow. This nomination went to the chief of the HPA in Berlin and to the Army Group Vistula. Major Joachim Domaschk noted on 28 April: "Waiting for announced statement!". The nomination list of the higher grade of the Knight's Cross of the Iron Cross with Oak Leaves notes the entry date of 19 March 1945. This is the date when the nomination was sent. An almost unreadable comment states "Waiting". According to Fellgiebel a note claims "service proposal regarding immediate presentation pending". Scherzer does not confirm this entry but states that a comment "Waiting for announced statement" is noted instead. No further comments indicate that the nomination was further processed. According to the Association of Knight's Cross Recipients (AKCR) the award was presented in accordance with the Dönitz-decree. This is illegal according to the Deutsche Dienststelle and lacks legal justification.

See also
List of people who disappeared

References

Citations

Bibliography

1896 births
1945 deaths
German Army personnel killed in World War II
German Army personnel of World War I
German police officers
German untitled nobility
Major generals of the German Army (Wehrmacht)
Missing person cases in Germany
People from the Province of Silesia
People from Złotoryja County
Prussian Army personnel
Recipients of the clasp to the Iron Cross, 2nd class
Recipients of the Gold German Cross
Recipients of the Knight's Cross of the Iron Cross with Oak Leaves
Missing in action of World War II
German Army generals of World War II
Recipients of the Hanseatic Cross (Lübeck)
Recipients of the Iron Cross (1914), 2nd class